Mystery in Mexico is a 1948 crime thriller directed by Robert Wise. It stars William Lundigan, Jacqueline White and Ricardo Cortez. The film centers around the search for an insurance investigator who went to Mexico to check on some valuable jewelry. The film was shot on location in Mexico City and Cuernavaca.

Plot
On a flight to Mexico City, insurance investigator Steve Hastings (William Lundigan) befriends singer Victoria Ames (Jacqueline White), attempting to get information about her missing brother, fellow investigator Glenn Ames (Walter Reed), who the firm suspects may have taken a stolen necklace he was tasked with recovering.  Their search for the brother leads them to nightclub owner John Norcross (Ricardo Cortez) and his sometimes girlfriend, singer Dolores Fernandez,(Jacqueline Dalya). Taxi driver Carlos (Tony Barrett), who has been helping Hastings, turns out to be Norcross's stooge, and reveals to the nightclub owner where the injured brother has been recuperating with a simple Mexican family.

Cast
William Lundigan as Steve Hastings
Jacqueline White as Victoria Ames
Ricardo Cortez as John Norcross
Tony Barrett as Carlos
Jacqueline Dalya as Dolores Fernandez
Walter Reed as Glenn Ames

Production
Principal photography for Mystery in Mexico took place at RKO's Estudios Churubusco in Mexico City and their studios in Hollywood in late September and October, and early and mid-November 1947.  Location shooting took place in Cuernavaca and other places in Mexico.

References

External links

1948 films
Films directed by Robert Wise
1940s crime thriller films
American crime thriller films
American black-and-white films
Films scored by Paul Sawtell
RKO Pictures films
1940s American films